This is a list of Tamil national-type primary schools (SJK(T)) in Negeri Sembilan, Malaysia. As of June 2021, there are 61 Tamil primary schools with a total of 8,744 students.

List of Tamil national-type primary schools in Negeri Sembilan

Jelebu District

Kuala Pilah District

Port Dickson District

Rembau District

Seremban District

Tampin District

Jempol District

See also 

 Tamil primary schools in Malaysia
 Lists of Tamil national-type primary schools in Malaysia

References

Schools in Negeri Sembilan
Negeri Sembilian
 Tamil-language schools in Malaysia